Dark Vengeance may refer to:

 Dark Vengeance (True Justice), an episode of the TV series True Justice
 Dark Vengeance (film), a 1993 action/science fiction film
 Dark Vengeance (video game), a 1998 video game by GT Interactive